The Highworth branch line was a short railway branch line to the northeast of Swindon, England, in use from 1883 to 1962. It was most successful as a goods line, particularly during wartime when it linked the Great Western Main Line to factories around the town. A small vestigial part of the line exists for this purpose.

Route
The line branched off the Great Western Main Line east of Swindon station.

History
There had been demands for railway access from Highworth since the mid-19th century. The town had been on one of the proposed routes of the Great Western Main Line before it was rerouted south to Swindon. In 1873, the Highworth Light Railway company was established to build the line, which was given parliamentary approval on 21 June 1875. Bad weather delayed the start of construction until 6 March 1879.

The Highworth branch line operated a service for paying passengers from 9 May 1883. It became popular as a goods line in the early 20th century, as numerous industrial sites were established to the west of it at Stratton, including a Brunner Mond munitions factory in 1916. It was again important during World War II, when Stanton station served army camps in the area, and a spur was built to provide access to the new Vickers-Armstrongs aircraft factory. A passenger service for workers at the factory was provided from 1941 to 1944, and December 1956 to June 1957.

The line was not commercially successful as a passenger route. Following nationalisation, services were proposed to be withdrawn by British Railways in 1952 although the goods service would remain open. The passenger service closed on 2 March 1953, while goods services from Highworth to Kingsdown Road continued until 3 August 1962.

References 
Citations

Bibliography

 
 

Railway lines constructed by the Great Western Railway
Closed railway lines in South West England
Transport in Swindon
Rail transport in Wiltshire
History of Wiltshire
Railway lines opened in 1853
Railway lines closed in 1962